Hypodoxa calliglauca is a moth of the family Geometridae first described by Alfred Jefferis Turner in 1926. It is found in the Australian states of New South Wales and Queensland.

The larvae feed on Leptospermum species.

References

Moths described in 1926
Pseudoterpnini